McBurney School was a boys college-preparatory school in Manhattan run by the YMCA of Greater New York. Its name commemorates Robert Ross McBurney, a prominent New York YMCA leader during the late 19th century.

Among its alumni are actors Henry Winkler, Robert De Niro, Richard Thomas, physician Lewis Thomas, journalists Ted Koppel, Haynes Johnson, and Gordon Joseloff, designer/inventor Bran Ferren, musicians Adam Horovitz, Richie Birkenhead and Richard Goode, historian David Brion Davis, J.D. Salinger, and financiers Bruce Wasserstein and Felix Rohatyn.

History

"Established in 1916 as a part of the educational program of the YMCA of Greater New York, McBurney School commemorated in its name one of the pioneers in work with boys and young men during the latter years of the nineteenth century, the first paid secretary of the YMCA of New York. 
For many years the School was a part of the education department of the West Side Branch, first on West 57th Street and then, in 1929, at 5 West 63rd Street where a separate portion of the larger building was prepared for the School. By 1935 the educational work of the City Association had increased to a point where a Schools Branch was justified. The direction of this Branch centered in McBurneys' 15 West 63rd Street building and provided for the operation of four, sometimes five, schools. This arrangement continued until, by 1957, increases in enrollment called for the accommodation of 450 boys. It was decided, therefore, to discontinue all of the departments except McBurney and the Evening High School and to prepare in 15 West 63rd street a proper setting for a college preparatory school. In September, 1958, the first part of the renovation was finished, and the building at 15 West 63rd Street was ready for McBurney use."

With the construction of Lincoln Center only a block to the west, the value of the school property increased dramatically after 1965.  In the mid-1980s the YMCA sold the property for residential development. In spite of mergers and a move to 20 West End Avenue, The New York Times reported that McBurney shut its doors and auctioned off its contents on August 3, 1988.

Legacy

In popular culture
McBurney was Holden Caulfield's destination when he left all the equipment of the Pencey Prep fencing team on the subway in Salinger's novel The Catcher in the Rye.

Administration & Faculty 

Headmasters

 1916–1918: Newel W. Edson
 1918–1952: Thomas Hemenway – also oratory teacher
1920:  Adolf Augustus Berle:  Head of “Junior School”
 1952–1962: Benjamin D. Chamberlin (retired Feb. 1, 1962)
 1962-1972: James J. Quinn Jr., Ph.D.
 Aug 1972– May 1974:  E. Duane Meyer, Ed.D
 June 1974 – 1983 Anthony F. Capraro III, Ph.D.
 Late 1983 Mar 1984:  Andrew Thomas Carr Stifler
 Mar 1984–Mar 1988:  Lawrence N. Tallamy
 1982–1982 Andrew Thomas Carr Stifler

Notable staff
 Earl Newsom: English and mathematics teacher 1923,4

Notable alumni
 Richie Birkenhead musician; graduated in 1983
 Bran Ferren: Designer and Inventor
 James R. Gaines: Author, chief editor of Time, Life and People magazines
 Richard Goode musician; graduated c. 1960
 Ad-Rock (Adam Keefe Horovitz) musician
 Haynes Bonner Johnson: Pulitzer Prize winning columnist (Washington Post) (July 9, 1931 – May 24, 2013); Journalism Professor, Univ Maryland
 Gordon Joseloff: Journalist) (graduated 1963)
 Ted Koppel (Entered McBurney ’53, graduated 1956 at age 16) (ABC News Anchor) (aka:  Edward James Koppel)
 Paul F. Levy: Attended grades 11 and 12, graduated in 1968; Former CEO of Beth Israel Deaconess Medical Center
 Johnny Marks (1927): wrote the music to “Rudolph the Red-Nosed Reindeer” 
 Martin Mayer (1943):  Best selling author 
 Alan Merrill (name Allan P. Sachs):  Rock Musician; attended in ninth and part of 10th grade; classmates with 1967 grads
 J.D. Salinger (attended from 1932 to 1934) 
 Felix George Rohatyn:  Financier who engineered the bailout of NYC in the 70s
 Richard Thomas:  actor in “The Waltons;” attended grades 10 thru 12, graduated about 1969
 Bruce Wasserstein:  Investment Banker (grad 1964)
 Henry Winkler Emmy Award Winning Actor. Graduated in 1963.
 Bill Knapp Veteran political strategist serving global and domestic clients - heads of state and Forbes 100 companies

References

Preparatory schools in New York (state)
Educational institutions established in 1916
Defunct high schools in Manhattan
Educational institutions disestablished in 1988
Universities and colleges founded by the YMCA
1916 establishments in New York City